Hulk and the Agents of S.M.A.S.H. is an American animated television series based on the superhero character by Marvel Comics. The series premiered on August 11, 2013, on Disney XD as part of the Marvel Universe block, and ended on June 28, 2015.

Plot
The story is told from the perspective of an online reality show created by Rick Jones to foster public acceptance of the Hulk as a hero and not a monster. The "show" is filmed by robotic flying cameras that accompany the Agents of the Supreme Military Agency of Super Humans (S.M.A.S.H.) everywhere they go, resulting in humorous vignettes and visual gags throughout each episode.

Hulk, She-Hulk, Red Hulk, A-Bomb, and Skaar come together as the Agents of S.M.A.S.H. to tackle threats that no other superheroes can face. The Agents of S.M.A.S.H. have their base near the town of Vista Verde (where Bruce Banner first became Hulk) and often face various threats with a recurring one being from Hulk's archenemy Leader (who holds the key to Skaar's origin).

In Season Two, upon their return to Earth following their fights with the Kree and the Skrull, the Agents of S.M.A.S.H. are hunted by S.H.I.E.L.D. and the military (which now have Hulkbuster technology) following the incident caused by the Leader's Agents of C.R.A.S.H. After proving their innocence, the Agents of S.M.A.S.H. will later have to deal the Leader traveling back in time to alter history, followed by an invasion led by the Supreme Intelligence and the Kree Armada in the wake of the incarceration of Ronan the Accuser.

Episodes

Cast
 Fred Tatasciore – Bruce Banner / Hulk
 Seth Green – Rick Jones / A-Bomb
 Eliza Dushku – Jennifer Walters / She-Hulk
 Clancy Brown – Thaddeus "Thunderbolt" Ross / Red Hulk
 Benjamin Diskin – Skaar
 James Arnold Taylor – Samuel Sterns / Leader

Production 
Hulk and the Agents of S.M.A.S.H. was unveiled at the 2011 San Diego Comic Con. Pre-production was outsourced to Karactaz Animation of Wellington, New Zealand. Film Roman was contracted to produce. Before it aired, writers Paul Dini and Henry Gilroy were confirmed to be writing for the series. Supervising Producer Cort Lane described the series as, "a great story about a great group of characters who have a really interesting family-style dynamic. It's very funny, with just the most amazing voice cast." On July 26, 2014, Disney XD renewed the series for a second season.

On July 12, 2015, Stephen Wacker, Vice President of Marvel Animation confirmed that the series had ended after the second season.

Broadcast 
The series premiered on Teletoon in Canada on January 10, 2014, and on Disney XD in Australia on April 13, 2014. on Citv in the United Kingdom.

Reception 
Jesse Schedeen of IGN gave the show's premiere a "Mediocre" score of 5.8 out of 10, panning the show's reliance on variations of the same slapstick gags and breaking of the fourth wall, which came at the expense of dramatic weight. Schedeen surmised that this material was targeted to an audience of boys age 6–12, and stated that the material could have been catered to an all-ages audience that included adults as well. Schedeen summarized the show as "a disappointing new addition to Disney XD's growing Marvel lineup."

References

External links

 

2010s American animated television series
2010s American comic science fiction television series
2013 American television series debuts
2015 American television series endings
American children's animated action television series
American children's animated adventure television series
American children's animated comic science fiction television series
American children's animated superhero television series
Animated television series based on Marvel Comics
Disney XD original programming
Television shows based on Marvel Comics
Hulk (comics) television series
Marvel Animation
Television series by Film Roman
Television series by Disney–ABC Domestic Television